Rasik Shah (12 August 1922, Mumbai - 5 October 2016), was a Gujarati language writer from  Gujarat, India. He received Sahitya Akademi Award (2015) for his book Ante Aarambh (part 1, 2), a collection of essays written on philosophy, psychology, mathematics, education and language.

References 

1922 births
2016 deaths
Gujarati-language writers
Recipients of the Sahitya Akademi Award in Gujarati
Writers from Mumbai